Urs Siegenthaler (born 23 November 1947) is a former Swiss footballer, turned manager. Since 13 May 2005 he is Chiefscout and Analyser for the Germany national team.

Playing career
Born in Basel, Siegenthaler started his football with local team FC Basel in 1957. He came through all their youth teams and, at the age of 18, he played his debut as a defender for the first team. With Basel he won the Swiss League championship five times and the Swiss Cup twice. He played the 1973–74 season for Xamax and then transferred to the Young Boys for two seasons. After playing one season for Winterthur he returned to Basel, where he ended his professional playing career.

Managerial career
Siegenthaler obtained his trainer diplome at the German Sport University Cologne in 1978 and spent the Nationalliga 1979–80 season as player manager for Schaffhausen. He was then manager for FC Laufen as they reached the second highest tier of the Swiss football league system for the first time in the club's history.

He acted as a youth coach for FC Grenchen and as trainer instructor for the Swiss Football Association. From 1987 to 1990 he was chief coach of FC Basel and then co-coach of the Swiss national team. In May 2005 he was appointed as Analyser for the Germany national team during the time when Jürgen Klinsmann was trainer. Then as Joachim Löw was appointed chief coach, Siegenthalers contract as Chiefscout was prolonged.

Honours
Basel
 Swiss League champion: 1966-67, 1968-69, 1969-70, 1971-72 1972-73
 Swiss Cup winner: 1966-67
 Swiss Cup runner-up: 1969–70, 1971–72, 1972–73
 Swiss League Cup winner: 1972
 Coppa delle Alpi winner: 1969, 1970
 Uhren Cup winner: 1969, 1970

Sources and references
 Rotblau: Jahrbuch Saison 2015/2016. Publisher: FC Basel Marketing AG.

External links
 Team behind the team on dfb.de

FC Basel players
Neuchâtel Xamax FCS players
BSC Young Boys players
FC Winterthur players
FC Laufen players
Swiss men's footballers
Swiss football managers
Association football midfielders
FC Schaffhausen managers
FC Basel managers
1947 births
Living people
Footballers from Basel